Elaphomyces (‘deer truffles’) is a genus of hypogeous fungi in the family Elaphomycetaceae. The widespread genus contains 25 truffle-like species. Elaphomyces is one of the most important ectomycorrhizal fungal genera in temperate and subarctic forest ecosystems. E. asperulus, E. granulatus, and E. muricatus were found to accumulate arsenic (12–660 mg/kg in dry mass); the composition of organoarsenicals is very unusual, with methylarsonic acid and trimethylarsine oxide as major As compounds.

Species
Elaphomyces aculeatus
Elaphomyces anthracinus
Elaphomyces citrinus
Elaphomyces compleximurus
Elaphomyces cyanosporus
Elaphomyces digitatus
Elaphomyces granulatus,  known as deer balls, hart's balls, hart's truffles, or lycoperdon nuts (cf. Lycoperdon)
Elaphomyces japonicus
Elaphomyces leucosporus
Elaphomyces leveillei
Elaphomyces morettii
Elaphomyces muricatus
Elaphomyces officinalis
Elaphomyces viridiseptum

References

Eurotiomycetes genera
Eurotiales